Sir John Clerk of Pennycuik, 5th Baronet FRSE (1736–1798) was a Royal Navy officer. Active in the Philosophical Society of Edinburgh, he thereby became a founder fellow of the Royal Society of Edinburgh upon its formation in 1783.

Life
He was born in Midlothian the son of Sir George Clerk-Maxwell (1715–84) and his wife, Dorothea. John became a baronet upon the death of his father in 1784.

He became Director of the Highland Society in 1785.

He died on 24 February 1798 and is buried with his wife, Rosemary Dacre Appleby in Penicuik churchyard. They had no children and the baronetcy passed to his nephew George.

Artistic recognition

A famous portrait of Sir John and Lady Clerk, by Sir Henry Raeburn, is held by the National Gallery of Ireland.

References

1736 births
1798 deaths
Members of the Philosophical Society of Edinburgh
Founder Fellows of the Royal Society of Edinburgh
18th-century Scottish people
Royal Navy officers
People from Midlothian
Baronets in the Baronetage of Nova Scotia